A by-election was held for the New South Wales Legislative Assembly electorate of Smithfield on 23 June 1990 because of the resignation of Janice Crosio to successfully contest the 1990 federal election for Prospect.

The Smithfield by-election was held the same day as the Heffron and Granville by-elections.

Dates

Results

Janice Crosio resigned.

See also
Electoral results for the district of Smithfield
List of New South Wales state by-elections

Notes

References

1990 elections in Australia
New South Wales state by-elections
1990s in New South Wales